Vladislav Baláž (born January 28, 1984) is a Slovak former professional ice hockey player. He played in the Slovak Extraliga for HK Dukla Trenčín, MsHK Zilina and HKm Zvolen, as well as the Czech Extraliga for HC Litvínov.

External links

1984 births
Living people
HC Litvínov players
HC Prešov players
Herlev Hornets players
HK Dukla Trenčín players
HKM Zvolen players
KH Sanok players
Lewiston Maineiacs players
MsHK Žilina players
Sherbrooke Castors players
Slovak ice hockey forwards
Sportspeople from Prešov
Slovak expatriate ice hockey players in Canada
Slovak expatriate ice hockey players in the United States
Slovak expatriate ice hockey players in the Czech Republic
Slovak expatriate sportspeople in Poland
Slovak expatriate sportspeople in Denmark
Expatriate ice hockey players in Denmark
Expatriate ice hockey players in Poland